David Lemieux (born December 22, 1988) is a Canadian former professional boxer who competed from 2007 to 2022. who held the IBF middleweight title in 2015.

Early life
Lemieux was born in Montreal, Quebec on December 22, 1988 to André Lemieux, a French Canadian, and Aznive Khavloudjian, an Armenian from Lebanon. The couple divorced after having one son, two years senior to David. David was born after the departure of his father.

His mother remarried to an Armenian, Garo Melekian, who adopted the two children and became a mentor to David. Lemieux studied at the local Saint-François-de-Laval school, in the Ahuntsic district of Montréal, but did not excel in classes, spending most of time on the streets. He was eventually expelled from the school for street fights. Encouraged by his adoptive father to focus, he started training in Ring 83 located in Ahuntsic at the invitation of boxer Baha Laham, a neighbour of Lemieux.

Amateur career 
Lemieux began boxing at the age of nine. He won the Canadian Amateur Championship three times.

Lemieux lost his first four amateur fights, but then won 16 straight fights, including four national junior titles.

Lemieux is currently trained by Marc Ramsay. Previously, he was trained by Russ Anber and was featured with Anber in DVD tutorial series Title Boxing as a teenager. He also featured with Anber in the Rival Box tips series.

Lemieux was never interested in making a bid to join the Canadian Olympic boxing team which was woefully under-supported in the run-up to the Beijing Olympics. Instead, he and Russ Anber viewed the Olympic program as a dead-end which would have him competing against boxers with vastly more experience while limiting his training prospects in ways detrimental to a fighter with professional aspirations.

He finished his amateur career with 91 wins and 12 defeats.

Professional career

Early career 
Although Lemieux planned to turn pro at 17, he was required to wait until he turned 18 because of Canadian Boxing Federation rules. Quebec-based promotion company Groupe Yvon Michel (GYM) was quick to sign him to a multi-fight contract, pitting him against opponents in four-round bouts that quickly became crowd favorites in Montreal. Lemieux became a proven commodity, fighting televised six-rounders on ESPN's Friday Night Fights and filling out the undercard during several championship events. Lemieux won his first 20 bouts, all inside the distance.

Lemieux vs. Rubio 
On March 11, 2011 it was announced that Lemieux would appear in a WBC final eliminator against Marco Antonio Rubio (49-5-1, 43 KOs) at the Bell Centre in Montreal, Quebec on April 8 in the main event of ESPN's Friday Night Fights. Lemieux was favored to win in his hometown against the Mexican veteran. He came into the fight with a perfect record of 25 wins and no losses, with 24 wins inside the distance. Both fighters came in at 159 pounds. During the first five rounds, Lemieux dominated Rubio by landing hard power punches to his guard. Rubio came to life in round six and began to land hard punches as Lemieux tired. In the seventh round, Rubio knocked down Lemieux with a right hook to the head. Lemieux got up, but Rubio continued where he left off and threw more punches at him. With only seconds left in round seven, Lemieux's corner had seen enough and threw in the towel to stop the fight. After the fight Anber said that Lemieux still has a lot to work and improve on if he wants to reach the top level.

Lemieux vs. Alcine 
In October 2011, Lemieux signed a deal with Eye of the Tiger Management. At the same time, his promoter Groupe Yvon Michel, announced that he would next fight former WBA light middleweight champion Joachim Alcine (32-2-1, 19 KOs) on December 10 at the Bell Centre in Montreal. In a huge upset, Alcine defeated Lemieux. Lemieux was quoted as a 5 to 1 favorite by the wagertrackers. The fight was declared a majority decision over 12 rounds, with scores of 116-112 by two judges and an even scoring of 114-114 by the third one. Alcine was awarded the WBC International Middleweight title. Most ringside observers thought Alcine won the fight. Speaking after the fight, Lemieux praised Alcine, however felt he did enough, "I tip my hat to him, he's a true champion. I really thought I won. Now I have to return to the gym and start working out. I was prepared for this fight and took it very seriously, but I may have mismanaged my energy. Joachim, he knew what he had to do. I know what mistakes I made and I know that I can beat him." Yvon Michel admitted they underestimated Alcine. Alcine contemplated a move back down to light middleweight, but stated he was open to a rematch.

Rise up the ranks 
After the Alcine fight, Lemieux fought six straight bouts against opponents of mostly middling relevance, before facing Fernando Guerrero, a former light middleweight and middleweight contender who had only a year prior fought WBO middleweight champion Peter Quillin to a sixth round loss. The fight took place on the undercard of the WBC light heavyweight fight Stevenson vs. Fonfara on May 24, 2014. Lemieux dominated Guerrero, repeatedly dropping him before finishing him off in the third round with a brutal right uppercut. Lemieux won the NABF middleweight title with this win.

Lemieux vs. Rosado 
His next bout was confirmed on October 20, 2014 to take place Barclays Center in Brooklyn against fringe contender Gabriel Rosado (21-8, 13 KOs), defending his NABF middleweight belt on December 6. The fight was promoted by Golden Boy Promotions as a 'one-off' deal, according to Lemieux's manager Camille Estephan. Going into the fight, Lemieux wanted to take the opportunity to introduce himself as a threat to the middleweight division. The fight was shown live on HBO Boxing After Dark. Lemieux similarly dominated Rosado, dropping him in the third and pounding away at his mostly outmatched foe until the referee stopped the bout in the tenth due to swelling and cuts surrounding Rosado's eyes. It was the first HBO televised bout for Lemieux, who was hoping to challenge unified middleweight champion Gennady Golovkin in the near future. In the post-fight interview, Lemieux praised Rosado, "Hats off to Rosado. He is one hell of a fighter. I had tremendous preparation. I wanted to show all of you what I could do. I wanted to make a statement. Rosado is even better than I thought. I hope you enjoyed it." There was 6,532 in attendance for the fight. At the time of stoppage, Lemieux was ahead 90-80, 89-81 and 88-82 on all three judges scorecards. According to CompuBox stats, Lemieux landed 227 of 621 punches thrown (37%) and Rosado landed 142 of his 398 thrown (36%) The fight averaged 906,000 viewers and peaked at 1.16 million viewers.

IBF middleweight champion

Lemieux vs. N'Dam 
In February 2015, Lemieux accepted a fight against former interim WBO titleholder Hassan N'Dam N'Jikam (31-1, 18 KOs) for the vacant IBF middleweight championship. N'Dam became the mandatory challenger when he defeated Curtis Stevens in October 2014. Then-IBF champion Jermain Taylor, was facing legal issues, thus stripped of the title. The IBF originally ordered N'Dam vs. Felix Sturm for the vacant title, however Sturm stated he no longer wished to fight at 160 pounds. The IBF then ordered British contender Billy Joe Saunders, however he also passed as he was already mandated to fight for the WBO title. IBF then turned to their #5 ranked Lemieux. The purse bid was won by Golden Boy, who were the only promoter to turn up and bid the minimunt required $102,000 for the fight. On May 13, Golden Boy and Eye of the Tiger Management announced the fight would take place at the Bell Centre in Montreal on June 20. With over two weeks to go, it was confirmed the fight would be televised live on Fox Sports 2. HBO, who has recently signed Lemieux were unable to squeeze the bout into their boxing schedule for unknown reasons. Lemieux scored four knockdowns en route to a victory by unanimous decision. Two judges scored the bout 115-109 while the third saw it 114-110 for Lemieux, who improved to 34-2 with 31 knockouts. Over the 12 rounds, Lemieux landed 216 of 597 punches thrown (36%), while N'Dam landed 202 of his 627 thrown (32%). Lemieux out landed N'Dam in 4 of the rounds. Rounds 6, 7, 9 and 10 saw both fighters land equal amount of punches. The whole card only averaged 163,000 viewers. The win set up a showdown in October with unbeaten Golovkin, considered to be the best middleweight fighter in the world in 2015.

Lemieux vs. Golovkin 

It was announced in July 2015 that Gennady Golovkin would be defending his three world titles against Lemieux in a unification fight at the Madison Square Garden in New York City on October 17, 2015 live by HBO Pay-Per-View. Both boxers took to Twitter to announce the news. Lemieux won the then vacant IBF title by outpointing Hassan N'Dam N'Jikam in June 2015.

Lemieux lost the IBF middleweight title to Golovkin before a sold-out crowd of 20,548 at Madison Square Garden. Lemieux was down once in round 5. Golovkin was dominant from the first bell, landing punch after punch before the referee mercifully stepped in and stopped the fight in the eighth round. Golovkin was also ahead on all three judges scorecards (70-62 3 times). Lemieux earned a career high payday of $1.5 million and was guaranteed a share of PPV revenue whilst Golovkin earned a career high $2 million also including a share of the PPV profits. According to CompuBox statistics, Lemieux only landed 89 of 335 punches thrown (27%). Golovkin had a connect rate of 51% landing 280 of 549 punches.

Comeback trail
It was announced on March 17, 2016 that Lemieux would fight on the undercard of Canelo-Khan at the new T-Mobile Arena in Las Vegas on May 7, 2016. His opponent was announced to be Glen Tapia (23-2, 15 KOs), who was newly signed to Golden Boy and moving up in weight. Lemieux was due to fight against James De Lara Rosa a week earlier at a 163lb catchweight, but he failed to make weight, many believe this was done intentionally so he could fight at the new arena. Lemieux showed an improved jab, footwork and head movement. He dominated the fight, shaking Tapia numerous times leading into the fourth round where he knocked Tapia down. Tapia's trainer Freddie Roach waved the fight off right after.

After a few months of trying to negotiate a deal to fight Curtis Stevens, it was confirmed by Eye of the Tiger promotions that Lemieux would be fighting unknown Argentine Cristian Fabian Rios (21-7-3, 6 KOs) at the Centre Bell in Montreal on October 22. Lemieux was taken the distance only the fourth time in his career as he won a one-sided 10 round unanimous decision. Lemieux attempted to score a knockout, but wasn't able to get the job done against a durable Rios. The three judges scored the fight 100-90, 100-90 and 99-91. The win ensured Lemieux a possible future fight against the likes of Saul Alvarez or WBO middleweight champion Billy Joe Saunders in early 2017.

Lemieux vs. Stevens
On January 16, 2017 a fight between Lemieux and former world title challenger Curtis Stevens (29-5, 21 KOs) was finally agreed to main event a HBO: Boxing After Dark card on March 11 at the Turning Stone Resort & Casino in Verona, New York. Lemieux won the fight after he knocked Stevens out with a short left hook. The referee Charlie Fitch waived the count immediately after Stevens was left unconscious The stoppage took place in round 3, at 1 minute and 59 seconds. Emergency personnel entered the ring immediately to attend to Stevens. He was conscious however whilst being stretchered out of the arena. The fight averaged 606,000 viewers and peaked at 672,000 viewers for HBO. On Sunday morning following the fight, Stevens representatives confirmed he was OK.

Only a month after knocking out Stevens, Lemieux was added to the Canelo vs. Chavez Jr. undercard at the T-Mobile Arena in Nevada on May 6, 2017. His opponent was announced as 29 year old Mexican boxer Marcos Reyes (35-4, 26 KOs) in a 10-round fight. Reyes, being (3-3) in his last six bouts, was known for going the 10 round distance in a losing effort to Julio Cesar Chavez Jr. in 2015. Both fighters agreed a catch-weight for the fight and weighed in at 163 pounds. It was reported that Lemieux would earn $200,000 compared to Reyes who would earn $45,000. Lemieux won the fight by unanimous decision. The judges scored the fight 99-90, 99-90 and 98-91 in his favor. Lemieux landed the harder and cleaner punches throughout the fight. Reyes showed great determination and stayed on his feet landing quick combinations, although receiving a cut above the right eye in round 2. Reyes also lost a point in round 8 for hitting after the bell. Lemieux gave a good effort from the start, but started to tire out through the middle rounds, although he did enough to still win them, landing the bigger punches. Lemieux got his second wind in round 8, but still did not have the same power that we'd seen in the early rounds.

Lemieux vs. Saunders 
Lemieux made himself available as Miguel Cotto's final opponent, which would take place on December 2, 2017 on HBO at Madison Square Garden. According to a source, regardless of who Cotto fought, Lemieux would still appear on the card. After weeks of going back and forth with WBO champion Billy Joe Saunders (25-0, 12 KOs) on Twitter, on October 10, the WBO ordered them to meet in a mandatory fight with both camps having 30 days to negotiate a fight, which would likely take place early in 2018. On October 16, Lemieux's manager Camille Estephan stated the negotiations were going well for the fight and could possibly take place at the Bell Centre in Canada on December 16, 2017. He also stated that HBO were interested showcasing the fight. On October 17, WBO confirmed the fight had been signed to take place at the new Place Bell in Laval, Quebec. Lemieux failed in his attempt to regain a world title after losing to Saunders via a wide unanimous decision. The judges scored the fight 120-108, 117-111, 118-110. Both HBO and ESPN scored it a clear 120-108 for Saunders. Saunders picked Lemieux off with shots as he would plod forward trying to connect with his big power shots. The difference in hand speed and skills were vast. Saunders used his movement and jab effectively. Lemieux was never able to catch up to Saunders to land his big power shots. In the post-fight, Lemieux said, "I wasn't at my best. Hats off to Billy Joe, but as of the second round, my left hand, I couldn't use it the way I wanted to. And he was on the run, so I had a little bit of difficulties throwing my shots. So I gotta say it wasn't my best night." CompuBox showed that Saunders landed 165 of 430 punches (38%) and Lemieux landed 67 of his 356 thrown (19%). Saunders earned a minimum $1 million purse while Lemieux took home a $500,000 guaranteed purse. The fight averaged 716,000 viewers, peaking at 775,000 viewers.

A few days after the fight, Camille Estephan confirmed that Lemieux would be staying a middleweight, however will not be expected to fight until after April 2018 as he needed to rehab his shoulder.

Career from 2018–2019 
On April 11, 2018 sources in Canada stated that Lemieux would return to the ring on May 26 in Quebec, Canada and a press conference would be announced by Eye of the Tiger Management. A day later, it was officially announced that Lemieux would fight French boxer Karim Achour (26-4-3, 4 KOs) at the Videotron Centre, with Achour's WBC international title at stake as well as the vacant WBC Francophone title. Going into the fight, Achour had not been stopped in his 4 losses and was unbeaten in 13 fights dating back to March 2013. Lemieux weighed 162 pounds. He was given time to reduce his weight further, however within an hour, Camille Estephan told the officials that Lemieux would not be making the middleweight limit. Estephan told the Journal de Montreal, Lemieux had a disciplined training camp, however before the night of the weigh in, he went to bed weighing 164 pounds. At that point, he knew he would not be able to lose the additional weight and thought about his own health first. On fight night, Lemieux dominated Achour through the bout, eventually dropping him in round 12, winning the fight via a wide unanimous decision. The scorecards were 119-108, 120-107 and 119-107.

Lemieux vs. O'Sullivan 
In July 2018, Estephan began negotiating a deal for Lemieux to fight Irish boxer Gary O'Sullivan (28-2, 21 KOs) in the fall. The fight was likely to take place on the undercard of the Álvarez vs. Golovkin rematch, where O'Sullivan was already guaranteed a spot to fight. Lemieux had also been chasing the fight himself and taken to social media for months. After winning defeating Elias Espadas on July 21, Olympic medalist Yamaguchi Falcão, (16-0, 7 KOs) also made it known that he would fight Lemieux in September 2018. On August 1, via Irishboxing.com, O'Sulivan accepted the challenge and signed the contract a week later, awaiting confirmation of purse information. On August 20, the fight was made official. Lemieux won the fight via knockout after just 2 minutes and 44 seconds of round 1. Lemieux took advantage of a slow left hook thrown by O'Sullivan to counter him with a big left to the head which knocked him down. Referee Russell Mora stopped the fight almost immediately. After the fight, Lemieux said, "There's not a middleweight like David Lemieux. I felt great. I'm in superb shape. I give you guys great knockouts, great fights, and I hope you're happy." Despite the pre-fight trash talk, the two boxers embraced in the ring after the bout. For the bout Lemieux made $200,000 and O'Sullivan received a $400,000.

On October 31, 2018 it was first reported that Lemieux would appear on the Canelo Álvarez vs. Rocky Fielding undercard at Madison Square Garden on December 15, 2018. According to TVA Sports, Lemieux would be fighting Bahamian boxer Tureano Johnson (20-2, 14 KOs). On November 15, CBS Sports announced the undercard, which included Lemieux vs. Johnson. Speaking about the fight, Lemieux stated he did not take a break after his win over O'Sullivan and went back to the gym to start another training camp, with the ultimate goal being a world title fight against Álvarez. The fight was cancelled on the morning of the weigh-in after Lemieux was hospitalized due to severe dehydration.

Lemieux vs. Bursak 
On December 7, 2019, Lemieux fought Max Bursak. Bursak dropped Lemieux twice, once in the opening round and once in the fifth round. Lemieux returned the favor, dropping Bursak in the sixth round. In the end, Lemieux did enough to earn the split-decision victory over Bursak, winning 94-93 on two of the scorecards, while the third scorecard was 93-94 in favor of Bursak.

Lemieux vs. Ntetu 
On October 10, 2020, Lemieux fought and defeated Francy Ntetu in five rounds. Lemieux caught his opponent with big left hook and knocked him out to end the fight early.

Lemieux vs. Benavidez 
On May 21, 2022, Benavidez and Lemieux faced off in a defending title match where ultimately Benavidez won in the 3rd round by TKO becoming the interim WBC super middleweight champion. Lemieux earned the respect of many in this match-up, showing a big heart when he continued to fight even though he received hard punches early in the first few rounds that had him dazed.

Personal life 
Lemieux identifies himself as both Québécois and Armenian. He is a resident of Cartierville, a Montreal suburb. Lemieux has a son, Léon from a previous relationship, the mother later left to Moscow. A second child; a daughter who speaks Armenian as her first language, was born through another relationship. Lemieux speaks five languages: French, English, Armenian, Arabic, and Spanish (with French & English being his primary two languages of everyday use). On August 3rd 2021 he proposed to and got engaged to Canadian Olympic diver Jennifer Abel.

Lemieux was managed for many years by Group Yvon Michel (GYM). Starting January 2015 he was managed by Camille Estephan, a Canadian entrepreneur and promoter and owner of Eye of the Tiger Management (EOTTM).

Professional boxing record

Pay-per-view bouts

References

External links

David Lemieux - Profile, News Archive & Current Rankings at Box.Live

1988 births
Living people
Boxers from Montreal
Canadian people of French descent
Canadian people of Armenian descent
Canadian people of Lebanese descent
International Boxing Federation champions
Canadian male boxers
Super-middleweight boxers
Light-middleweight boxers
World middleweight boxing champions
Sportspeople of Lebanese descent